2021 Basketball Champions League Final was the concluding game of the 2020–21 Basketball Champions League season, the 5th season of FIBA's premier basketball league in Europe. The final and the Final Eight were played in the Trade Union Sport Palace in Nizhny Novgorod, Russia.

San Pablo Burgos won its second Champions League title after defeating Pınar Karşıyaka.

Background

Pınar Karşıyaka
For Karşıyaka, this was the first Basketball Champions League Final, and the second final for a Turkish side after Bandırma B.İ.K. had reached the final in 2017.

San Pablo Burgos
San Pablo Burgos were the defending champions after having defeated AEK in 2020.

Teams

Venue
The Trade Union Sport Palace was the stage of the final tournament for the first time.

Road to the final

Game details

References

External links 
 Basketball Champions League (official website)

Final
2021
Karşıyaka S.K.
CB Miraflores